Paul Mason (1898–1985) was an American writer, parliamentarian, historian, and assistant Secretary of the California State Senate in the first half of the 20th century.  Mason wrote the first edition of Mason's Manual of Legislative Procedure in 1935.

Early life
Mason was born in Idaho and was educated in schools of Idaho and Utah, interrupting education to enlist for infantry officer training, 1918. Received Bachelor's Degree, 1920. Later attended Stanford University, where he submitted a thesis on Procedure in the California Legislature, and was granted Master's Degree in Political Science, 1923. Admitted to Cal. State Bar, September, 1923, and entered private law practice for a time. Assistant Minute Clerk and File Clerk in the Senate in 1923. The Assistant Legislative Counsel, 1925 and 1927 Sessions. Chief Assistant Secretary of the Senate until 1931, when he became Parliamentarian.

Professional career
Paul Mason served for many years in California government:  Chief Assistant Secretary of the California Senate (1929–32); Chief, Division of Driver's Licenses (1937–53); Director of Motor Vehicles (1954–58); and Legislative Secretary to California Governor Goodwin Knight (1954–58).
 Mason is known primarily for two published works:  The Constitutional History of California and the Manual of Legislative Procedure.

According to the National Conference of State Legislatures (NCSL), Mason's Manual has become the most widely used legislative procedure guide in the U.S., currently in use by 77 of the 99 state legislative bodies in the United States.

Before Mason's death in 1985, he assigned the copyright of his manual to the NCSL. The book is edited by an NCSL commission every few years to keep it up-to-date with the latest legal precedents.

Mason's other seminal work was his Constitutional History of California. In this essay, Mason examines the Spanish alcalde origins of California's legal system, through the Mexican era, up through the framing of the Constitutions of 1849 and 1879.

In the California Senate, Mason served for many years under longtime Secretary of the Senate Joseph Beek.

References

External links
Biography and interview of Paul Mason in "The Governor's Office under Goodwin Knight : oral history transcripts / and related material, 1979–1980." Regional Oral History Office (ROHO), the Bancroft Library, University of California, Berkeley

1898 births
1985 deaths
20th-century American male writers
Stanford University alumni